Tea Tairović (born 4 April 1996) is a Serbian singer, songwriter and dancer. She began her career participating on the  televised singing competition Zvezde Granda, in 2013–14 and 2015–16, where she entered the finals. Her mainstream breakthrough came upon release of her song "Hajde" in 2021, while the following year she released her debut studio album, Balkanija.

Early life 
Tairović was born on 4 April 1996 in Novi Sad, FR Yugoslavia. Her mother, Božica Malević, worked as a TV presenter and her father, Zoran Tairović, is an academic painter. Tairović has been dancing since the age of three, when she started ballet school, and won second place at the World Championship in Show Dance. She trained in standard and Latin American dances, ballet and jazz ballet. She graduated from the Gymnasium Svetozar Marković, and then entered the Faculty of Philosophy at the University of Novi Sad. She expressed that she has no intention of studying psychology because her dream since childhood has been to become a singer.

Career

2013-2016: Zvezde Granda and career beginnings
Tairović released her first song called "Da si moj" in 2014; however, the song did not meet greater audience reactions, until 2015 when she appeared on the singing competition show Zvezde Granda, after she already participated in the competition once in 2013. She sang songs by Severina, Ana Nikolić, Tijana Dapčević, Jelena Karleuša, Aleksandra Radović, Nina Badrić, and others. In the final, she sang the song "Ti ne znaš kako je" by Nina Badrić and "Plamen od ljubavi" by Colonia. She did not make it to the superfinals, but the production gave her a recording of the song called "Karakerna osobina", which was also the second single of her career.
In November 2016, she released her third song "Meni odgovara". Her third single "Igračica" was released in April of next year. Following "Igračica", she released five more singles before the end of the year.

2017-2019: Breakthrough and further success
The single "Nevolja" was written and produced by the Bosnian duo Buba Corelli and Jala Brat. In June 2017, she recorded a duet with Šaban Šaulić called "Od kad tebe znam". In September 2017, she released a collaboration "Idu dani" with the rapper Rimski. The music and lyrics were authored by Rimski and Filip Mladenović. She recorded the song "Drama" with the Macedonian folk singer Menil Velioski, which showcased a change in Tairović's sound. Towards the end of the year, Tea released her first ballad "I u dobu i u zlu". Ahead of the summer 2018, Tairović released a duet with Ivana Krunić called "Brat na brata". Several months later, she released a collaboration with DJ Shone called "Medikament". She released the self-written single called "Polako" in January 2019. She premiered the single in the show Zvezde Granda Specijal. In March 2019, she released song "Mala" in collaboration with rapper Tozla. During the same year, she released four more songs, two of which were duets.

2020-present: Balkanija and upcoming projects
In April 2020, she released single "Svetica". In January next year, Tairović comes to a turning point in her career after the release of "Hajde", whose lyrics were co-written by Tairović and Sanja Vučić. "Hajde" has so far collected over 86 million views on YouTube, thus becoming one of the top 10 most listened to songs in the Balkans. The song also later became Tairović's first entry on Billboard's newly introduced Croatia Songs chart. In September 2021, Tairović embarked on an American tour following the release of "Na jednu noć", which also entered Billboard's Croatia Songs chart. In May of the following year, she released her debut studio album, titled Balkanija, with nine new singles, of which "Dva i Dva" and "Dubai" are highlighted, which also reached Billboard'''s Croatia Songs chart. All nine songs from the album collectively have accumulated close to 280 million views on YouTube as of February 2023. In February 2023, she also announced her first big concert at Tašmajdan Stadion, in Belgrade for 11 June 17, of the same year.

 Discography 
Studio albums
 Balkanija (2022)

Non album singles
 Da si moj (2014)
 Karakterna osobina (2015)
 Meni odgovara (2016)
 Igračica (2017)
 Nevolja (2017)
 Otkad tebe znam (2017) feat. Šaban Šaulić
 Idu dani (2017) feat. Rimski
 Drama (2017) feat. Menil Velioski
 I u dobru i u zlu (2017)
 Brat na brata (2018) feat. Ivana Krunić
 Medikament (2018) feat. DJ Shone
 Polako (2019)
 Mala (2019) feat. Tozla
 Zdravo, doviđenja (2019) feat. Peđa London
 Dolce & Gabbana (2019)
 Samo moj (2019) feat. Monika
 Bliznakinja (2019)
 Svetica (2020)
 Hajde (2021)
 Na jednu noć'' (2021)

Filmography

References

External links
 
 

1996 births
Living people
Serbian folk-pop singers
21st-century Serbian women singers
Grand Production artists
Musicians from Novi Sad
People from Novi Sad